SNCF Class X 97150 railbusess, also known as type A2E (Autorails à 2 essieux), were built by Soulé in 1990. Three units, numbered X 97151-153 were built to work the Guingamp to Carhaix and Paimpol lines in Brittany.

Rails et Traction International, based in Raeren, Belgium have taken ownership of them and are making them available to open access rail operators.

References

X 97150
Diesel multiple units of France
Railcars of France